Synnöve Solbakken is a Swedish drama film from 1934 directed by Tancred Ibsen. The film script was written by Ibsen and Torsten Flodén. It is based on Bjørnstjerne Bjørnson's 1857 novel Synnøve Solbakken.

The film was shot at Irefilm's studios in Stockholm, and the outdoor scenes were shot in Vågå. Synnöve Solbakken premiered on October 22, 1934, at the Skandia cinema in Stockholm. The novel was adapted for film two other times in Sweden, in 1919 and in 1957.

Plot
Torbjörn and Synnöve are two children living in the same valley. Synnöve's mother does not like them playing with each other because Torbjörn's grandfather drinks. They have both now grown up. Torbjörn is teased for having an alcoholic grandfather. This leads to fights, which Synnöve wants him to stop. During a fight, Torbjörn is stabbed in the back and paralyzed. He asks Synnöve to seek another man and not commit herself to a cripple. One day he sees his father's carriage overturn and, distressed by the event, he suddenly get up for the first time since the paralysis. A miracle has happened, and he can finally have his beloved.

Cast

 Karin Ekelund as Synnöve Solbakken
 Fritiof Billquist as Torbjörn Granliden
 Helge Mauritz as Knut Nordhaug
 Gösta Gustafson as Aslak
 Victor Sjöström as Sämund Granliden
 Signe Lundberg-Settergren as Ingeborg Granliden
 Solveig Hedengran as Ingrid Granliden
 John Ekman as Guttorm Solbakken
 Hjördis Petterson as Karen Solbakken
 Justus Hagman as the doctor
 Ulla Wessman as Synnöve as a child
 Nils Granberg as Torbjörn as a child
 Törje Reuter as Knut as a child

Norwegian version
At the same time as the Swedish version of the film, a Norwegian version was made, in which Karin Ekelund was replaced by Randi Brænne.

References

External links

Synnöve Solbakken at the Swedish Film Database

1934 films
1930s Swedish-language films
Swedish romantic drama films
1934 romantic drama films
Swedish black-and-white films
Films directed by Tancred Ibsen